This is a list of weapons used by the Spanish Republican side of the Spanish civil war. The majority of Spanish Republican military equipment was obtained through the Soviet Union who supported the Spanish Republicans through shipments of Soviet arms and arms from other countries in the possession of the Soviet Union from past Russian conflicts.

Small arms

Rifles 

 Mauser Model 1893
 Mosin–Nagant
 Winchester 1873
 Vz. 24
 Karabinek wz. 1929(from buying from Poland) 
 Fusil Gras mle 1874
 M1917 Enfield
 Kropatschek rifle
 Mannlicher M1886
 Mannlicher M1888
 Lebel Model 1886 rifle
 Berthier rifle
 Ross rifle
Lee–Enfield
Gewehr 1888
Winchester Model 1895
Spanish 1893
Type 30 rifle
Type 35 rifle
Type 38 rifle

Sidearms 

 Astra 400
 Astra 900
 Mauser C96
 Nagant 1895

Machine guns 

 Hotchkiss Mle 1914
 Hotchkiss M1922
 Lewis gun
PM M1910
Degtyaryov machine gun
M1918 Browning Automatic Rifle
Maxim–Tokarev
Chauchat
Ckm wz. 30
Wz.28 BAR
M1895 Colt–Browning machine gun

Submachine guns 

 Erma EMP
 Suomi KP/-31
 Labora Fontbernat M-1938
 PPD-40
 Thompson
 Naranjero
 Star Si 35

Artillery

Infantry support guns 

 Canon d'Infanterie de 37 modèle 1916 TRP

Field artillery 

 76 mm divisional gun M1902
 76 mm divisional gun M1902/30
 7.7 cm FK 16
 Type 38 10 cm cannon
 Skoda houfnice vz 14
 Canon de 105 mle 1913 Schneider
QF 4.5-inch howitzer

Heavy artillery 

 122 mm howitzer M1910/30
 BL 60-pounder gun
 152 mm gun M1910/30
 BL 6-inch 26 cwt howitzer
 Canon de 155 L Modele 1917 Schneider
 152 mm howitzer M1910

Mountain guns 

 Canon de 65 M (montagne) modele 1906
 76 mm mountain gun M1909

Anti-tank guns 

 37 mm anti-tank gun M1930 (1-K)
 45 mm anti-tank gun M1932 (19-K)

Anti-aircraft guns 

 76 mm air defense gun M1931

Armoured fighting vehicles 

 List of tanks in the Spanish Civil War

References

Weapons,Republicans
Weapons of Spain
Lists of weapons
Weapons by war